This is a list of seasons completed by the Michigan Wolverines football team of the National Collegiate Athletic Association (NCAA) Division I Football Bowl Subdivision (FBS). Since the team's creation in 1879, the Wolverines have participated in more than 1,200 officially sanctioned games, including 49 bowl games.

Michigan originally competed as a football independent. Michigan joined the Big Ten Conference (then known as the Western Conference) as one of the founding members in 1896. The Wolverines also competed as an independent between 1907 and 1916, but rejoined the Big Ten in 1917, of which it has been a member since.

Seasons

See also
List of Big Ten Conference football standings (1896–1958)
List of Big Ten Conference football standings (1959–present)

References

Michigan

Michigan Wolverines football seasons